Mankato Airport  is a city-owned public-use airport located one nautical mile (1.85 km) northwest of the central business district of Mankato, a city in Jewell County, Kansas, United States.

Although most U.S. airports use the same three-letter location identifier for the FAA and IATA, this airport is assigned TKO by the FAA but has no designation from the IATA.

Facilities and aircraft 
It has two runways: 17/35 is 3,540 by 50 feet (1,079 x 15 m) with an asphalt pavement and 9/27 is 2,505 by 100 feet (764 x 30 m) with a turf surface. For the 12-month period ending February 20, 2009, the airport had 5,400 general aviation aircraft operations, an average of 14 per day.

References

External links 
 Aerial photo as of 24 March 2003 from USGS The National Map
 

Airports in Kansas
Buildings and structures in Jewell County, Kansas